Tonuzoba or Tonuzaba was a Pecheneg tribal chieftain who settled  with his people in Hungary about 950 AD. He is the first known ancestor of the  Tomaj,  Szalók, Bő and Örkény kindreds. 

He was given lands from Taksony in the county of Heves. Györffy argues that he was related to the grand prince, because Taksony's wife was of Pecheneg descent. According to the legend Tonuzoba was buried alive at Abádszalók because he refused to convert to Christianity.

References

Tomaj (genus)
10th-century Hungarian people
Pechenegs